DEMETER (Detection of Electro-Magnetic Emissions Transmitted from Earthquake Regions) was a French micro-satellite operated by CNES devoted to the investigation of the ionospheric disturbances due to seismic and volcanic activity.

It was launched on June 29, 2004, on a quasi Sun-synchronous circular orbit with an inclination of about 98.23° and an altitude of about 710 km. The altitude was changed to about 660 km in December 2005.

Due to the specific orbit, DEMETER was always located either shortly before the local noon (10:30 local time) or local midnight (22:30 local time). The satellite performs 14 orbits per day and measures continuously between -65° and +65° of invariant latitude.

DEMETER observed an increase in ultra low frequency radio waves in the month before the 2010 Haiti earthquake.

During the 2010 eruption of Mount Merapi, DEMETER noted anomalies in the ionosphere.

Scientific operations ended December 9, 2010.

Scientific Objectives
 To study the ionospheric disturbances in relation to the seismic activity and to examine the pre- and post-seismic effects
 To study the ionospheric disturbances in relation to the volcano activity
 To survey the ionospheric disturbances in relation to the anthropogenic activity
 To contribute to the understanding of the generation mechanism of these disturbances
 To give a global information on the Earth's electromagnetic environment

Scientific Payload
 IMSC: three magnetic sensors from a few Hz up to 18 kHz
 ICE:  three electric sensors from DC up to 3.5 MHz
 IAP: an ion analyzer
 ISL: a Langmuir probe
 IDP: an energetic particle detector

Modes of Operation
Due to the limited capacity of the telemetry, there were two different modes of operation:
 During the "Survey mode", averaged data were collected all around the Earth. The telemetry flow in this mode was reduced by the on-board data processing to 25 kbit/s.
 During the "Burst mode", high-precision data were collected above the specific areas of interest, corresponding mostly to the seismic regions. The data bit rate in this mode was 1.7 Mbit/s.

References

External links
 CNES project web page
 DEMETER data server providing a free access to the low-resolution "quicklook" data
 Spacecraft Saw ULF Radio Emissions over Haiti before January Quake | MIT Technology Review

Earth observation satellites of France
Spacecraft launched in 2004
Spacecraft launched by Dnepr rockets
CNES